Tamisiocaris (from Latin tamisium, sieve, and Greek  karis, crab, shrimp) is a radiodont genus initially only known from frontal appendages from the Buen Formation in Sirius Passet. Further specimens revealed that the frontal appendages were segmented and bore densely-packed auxiliary spines, which were adapted to suspension feeding in a manner analogous to modern baleen whales.

See also

References 

Anomalocaridids
Prehistoric arthropod genera
Cambrian arthropods
Cambrian Greenland
Fossils of Greenland
Sirius Passet fossils
Buen Formation
Fossil taxa described in 2010
Cambrian genus extinctions